Gebhard Fugel (14 August 1863 – 26 February 1939) was a German painter specializing in Christian themes. He is best known for his work as the leading artist of the Crucifixion Panorama in Altötting.

Life and work 
Fugel was born in Oberklöcken near Ravensburg, and grew up in Upper Swabia. In Ravensburg, he was an apprentice of Theodor Schnell and Burkhard Edinger. From 1879 to 1885, he studied at the Kunstschule in Stuttgart with Alexander von Liezen-Mayer and Claudius Schraudolph the Younger, among others. While still a student, he began to focus on Christian motifs inspired by the works of the Nazarene movement. In 1885, his painting Christ Healing the Sick received favorable notice in an exhibition at the Kunstverein München. This enabled him to exhibit more widely.

In 1890, he moved to Munich permanently and participated in founding of the German Society for Christian Art (DGCK). He soon focused on altarpieces and large-format church murals. He created a panorama of the Crucifixion of Christ for Kevelaer, a pilgrimage destination at the Lower Rhine, in 1895. He created a Panorama of Bethlehem in 1901, which was presented in Zürich, Switzerland. Both works are lost. It is one of the last surviving panoramas and is unusual for portraying a religious subject, rather than the customary historical scenes, usually battles. Fugel and the architect financed the project. The Panorama is a listed historic monument of Bavaria and the UNESCO.

In 1905, he was named a royal professor. He created 136 religiously-themed , large format pictures displayed in classrooms for educational purposes. Many were also used as illustrations for school texts and various other books. Fugel died in Munich.

Streets have been named after him in Ravensburg, Weingarten, Friedrichshafen, Altötting and Munich. The  was established by his grandson, Gebhard Streicher, in 1979 and is awarded every three years by the DGCK.

Paintings

References

Sources
 Ludwig Baur: "Der Kreuzweg von Gebhard Fugel". In: Archiv für christliche Kunst. 28. Jg. 1910, pgs.4–8 (Online)
 Ludwig Baur: "Die Fugelschen Fresken in der kath. Stadtpfarrkirche zu Ravensburg". In: Archiv für christliche Kunst. 28. Jg. 1910, pgs. 65–66, 73–76, 81–82 and 92–95 (Online)
 Oskar Döring-Dachau: "Gebhard Fugel" In: Die christliche Kunst, 6. Jg. 1909–1910, pgs. 133–143 (Online)
 Bernd Feiler: "Der Blaue Reiter und der Erzbischof. Religiöse Tendenzen, christlicher Glaube und kirchliches Bekenntnis in der Malerei Münchens von 1911 bis 1925". Dissertation, LMU München, 2002 (Online)
 Karl Muth: "Von christlicher Malerei und ihren Schöpfern". In: Hochland – Monatsschrift für alle Gebiete des Wissens, der Literatur und Kunst. Kösel, Kempten und München, 4. Jg. 1906–1907, Vol. I, pgs.60–66 (Online)

Further reading 
 Peter Eitel: "Fugel, Gebhard", In: Maria Magdalena Rückert (Ed.): Württembergische Biographien unter Einbeziehung hohenzollerischer Persönlichkeiten. Vol. I. Im Auftrag der Kommission für geschichtliche Landeskunde in Baden-Württemberg. Kohlhammer, Stuttgart 2006, S. 83–84.
 Gabriele Koller: Das Jerusalem-Panorama Kreuzigung Christi in Altötting (Kunstführer; Nr. 2487). Schnell und Steiner, Regensburg 2002, .
 Walter Rothes: Gebhard Fugel. Eine Einführung in des Meisters Werk und Leben. Parcus & Co., München 1925.
 Franz Schultheiß: Gebhard Fugel. Eine Lebens- und Künstlerskizze. Süddeutsche-Verlagsanstalt, Ulm 1920.
 Gebhard Streicher (Ed.): Gebhard Fugel. Apokalypse. Exhibit at the Stadtgalerie Altötting. Büro Wilhelm, Amberg 2003,

External links 

 Panorama Kreuzigung Christi
 
 
 Gemälde: Lasset die Kindlein zu mir kommen Westfalen Museum
 Gebhard Fugel's 'An den Wassern Babylons' jerusalem.nottingham.ac

1863 births
1939 deaths
19th-century German painters
19th-century German male artists
Religious painters
German muralists
Panoramas
Christian artists
People from Swabia (Bavaria)
20th-century German painters
20th-century German male artists